Ivailo is a small village just near the city of Pazardzhik. It would take approximately four minutes to commute between the two.

Villages in Pazardzhik Province